Frugality is the quality of being frugal, sparing, thrifty, prudent or economical in the consumption of consumable resources such as food, time or money, and avoiding waste, lavishness or extravagance.

In behavioral science, frugality has been defined as the tendency to acquire goods and services in a restrained manner, and resourceful use of already owned economic goods and services, to achieve a longer term goal.

Strategies
Common techniques of frugality include reduction of waste, curbing costly habits, suppressing instant gratification by means of fiscal self-restraint, seeking efficiency, avoiding traps, defying expensive social norms, detecting and avoiding manipulative advertising, embracing cost-free options, using barter, and staying well-informed about local circumstances and both market and product/service realities. Frugality may contribute to health by leading people to avoid products that are both expensive and unhealthy when used to excess. Frugal living is mainly practiced by those who aim to cut expenses, have more money, and get the most they possibly can from their money.

Philosophy
In the context of some belief systems, frugality is a philosophy in which one does not trust (or is deeply wary of) "expert" knowledge from commercial markets or corporate cultures, claiming to know what is in the best economic, material, or spiritual interests of the individual.

Different spiritual communities consider frugality to be a virtue or a spiritual discipline. The Religious Society of Friends and the Puritans are examples of such groups. The basic philosophy behind this is the idea that people ought to save money in order to allocate it to more charitable purposes, such as helping others in need.

There are also environmentalists who consider frugality to be a virtue through which humans can make use of their ancestral skills as hunter-gatherers, carrying little and needing little, and finding meaning in nature instead of man-made conventions or religion. Henry David Thoreau expressed a similar philosophy in Walden, with his zest for self-reliance and minimal possessions while living simply in the woods.

Corporate world
Frugality has been adopted as a strategic imperative by large enterprises as a means of cost reduction through engenderment of a philosophy of careful spending amongst the workforce. Cost reduction is often perceived negatively, be it within a corporate organisation or in society, so inviting each employee to embrace frugality transfers the burden of cost reduction from management to the employee. In doing so, corporations introduce a moral obligation to cost cutting, proposing the notion that careful management of costs is in the company, shareholder and employee's best interests.

See also

References

Intentional living
Simple living
Virtue
Waste management concepts
Frugality